The Archdeacon of Cloyne was a senior ecclesiastical officer within the Diocese of Cloyne until 1835; and then within the Diocese of Cork, Cloyne and Ross until 1986 when it merged with the Archdeaconry of Cork. As such he was responsible for the disciplinary supervision of the clergy within the Cloyne Diocese.

The archdeaconry can trace its history from Colman O'Scannlain, the first known incumbent, who died in 1189 to the last discrete holder Arthur Charles Gill. In between Thomas Wetherhead, Michael Boyle and William Steere went on to be bishops.

References

 
Lists of Anglican archdeacons in Ireland
Diocese of Cork, Cloyne and Ross
Religion in County Cork